The Central Labour College, also known as The Labour College, was a British higher education institution supported by trade unions. It functioned from 1909 to 1929. It was established on the basis of independent working class education.

The college was formed as a result of the Ruskin College strike of 1909. The Plebs' League, which had been formed around a core of Marxist students and former students of Ruskin, held a meeting at Oxford on 2 August 1909. A resolution was passed calling for the establishment of a Central Labour College to provide independent working class education, outside of the control of the University of Oxford. The provisional committee controlling the new college was to consist of representatives of Labour, Co-Operative and Socialist societies, following the model of the Labour Representation League.

The college was supported financially by the National Union of Railwaymen and the South Wales Miners' Federation. The college was headed by James Dennis Hird, who had been dismissed as principal of Ruskin for supporting the striking students. In 1911 the college moved to Earl's Court, London.

In 1915 the college was officially recognised by the Trades Union Congress, and it became the centre of the National Council of Labour Colleges, a national network of colleges, in 1921. In 1926 it was proposed to merge the CLC and Ruskin College into a new Labour College based at Easton Lodge near Great Dunmow, Essex. However, the move was opposed by a number of large unions, and on 7 September the proposal by the General Council of the TUC to proceed was defeated on a card vote.

By 1929 the mining industry was in severe decline due to the Great Depression. In April a conference of the South Wales Miners' Federation voted to discontinue funding of the college unless additional levies could be raised from members. No such funding was forthcoming, and attempts to transfer the ownership of the college to the wider trade union movement were unsuccessful. By July it was clear that the college could not continue to operate, and it closed at the end of the month.

See also

 Scottish Labour College

References

Further reading 

 Craik, W.W., The Central Labour College (London, 1964)
Gibson, I., 'Marxism and Ethical Socialism in Britain: the case of Winifred and Frank Horrabin' (BA Thesis, University of Oxford, 2008)
 McIlroy, J., ‘Independent Working Class Education and Trade Union Education and Training’ in Roger Fieldhouse (ed.), A History of Modern British Adult Education (Leicester, 1996), ch.10
 Macintyre, S., A Proletarian Science: Marxism in Britain 1917-33 (Cambridge, 1980)
 Millar, J.P.M.M., The Labour College Movement (London, 1979)
 Phillips, A. and Putnam, T., ‘Education for Emancipation: The Movement for Independent Working-Class Education 1908-1928’, Capital and Class, 10 (1980), pp. 18–42
 Rée, J., Proletarian Philosophers: Problems in Socialist Culture in Britain, 1900-1940 (Oxford, 1984)
 Samuel, R., “British Marxist Historians, 1880-1980: Part One”, NLR, 120 (1980), pp. 21–96
 Samuel, R., The Lost World of British Communism (London, 2006)
 Simon, B., `The Struggle for Hegemony, 1920- 1926’ in idem (ed.), The Search for Enlightenment: The Working Class and Adult Education in the Twentieth Century, (London, 1990), pp. 15–70

External links
Catalogue of the College archives, held at the Modern Records Centre, University of Warwick

Educational institutions established in 1909
Educational institutions disestablished in 1929
Labor studies organizations
Labor schools
1909 establishments in the United Kingdom
1929 disestablishments in the United Kingdom